Krishnarajapuram railway station, also known as Krishnarajapura railway station (station code: KJM) is a suburb station located in Krishnarajapuram  which is located about 14 km away from the Bangalore City railway station. It is one of the important railway station serving the Bangalore metropolitan area and most of the trains have a stop here.

Some of the major routes include to the places of Howrah, Chennai Central, and Patna Jn. Some of the popular trains traveling to Bangalore are Lal Bagh Express (12608) to Chennai operating 7 times a week, Kanyakumari Express (16526) to Kanyakumari operating 7 times a week, and (22625) Chennai–Bangalore Double Decker Express to Bangalore operating 7 times a week.

Location
Krishnarajapuram railway station (station code: KJM) is located at the junction of the Old Madras Road (NH 4) and Outer Ring Road, Bangalore. The cable-stayed bridge of Old Madras Road crosses the tracks just near the station.

Gallery

Structure & expansion
Krishnarajapuram station has about 4 platforms and 2 thorough tracks for non-stopping trains. Most of the long-distance trains stop at platform 4, while incoming trains heading to Bangalore City stop at platform 3. Platform 1 is long enough only for eight coaches so it is used for goods and mail trains.
And apart from that existing platforms could accommodate only 19 coaches whereas all the trains which stop here have 24 coaches which causes inconvenience to the passengers. So the extension of the platforms were approved by the railways which was completed in fifteen days.

Junction
Krishnarajapuram railway station is a junction on the Bangalore–Chennai main line with a line from Guntakal joining the track into the station. However the Guntakal track is mostly used by freight trains and oil tankers from Whitefield, though a few express trains from Tamil Nadu and Kerala heading towards the north do use this line, bypassing Bangalore in the process. With the commencement of the Yeshvantapur railway station all trains moving towards Bangarpet from Yeshvantapur are given a stop here.

Connectivity
This station is well connected to many parts of the city by BMTC buses. This station has two entrances to access it, the KR Puram – Outer Ring Road (South entrance) where the bus stops are and the other Vijinapura – KR Puram Market road (North entrance) which is far less crowded.

See also
Hoodi Halt railway station

References

External links

Satellite Map of Krishnarajapuram Railway Station
Photos of the Cable bridge over Krishnarajapuram Railway Station

Railway stations in Bangalore
Bangalore railway division
Railway junction stations in Karnataka